
Bombard may refer to the act of carrying out a bombardment. It may also refer to:

Individuals
Alain Bombard (1924–2005), French biologist, physician and politician; known for crossing the Atlantic on a small boat with no water or food
Marc Bombard (1949–), American baseball player and coach

Weapons
Bombard (weapon), a cannon or mortar used throughout the Middle Ages and the early modern period
Blacker Bombard, an anti-tank weapon used by British forces during the early part of World War 2

Ships
Bombard (vessel), a small two-masted vessel like an English ketch, common in the Mediterranean in the 18th and 19th centuries
Bombarde (or Bombard), an alternative name for a bomb vessel in the 18th & 19th centuries 
, Royal Australian Navy patrol boat in commission from 1968 to 1993
, a United States Navy minesweeper in commission from 1944 to 1945
 Bombarde, a French Navy La Melpomène-class torpedo boat, commissioned 1938, later captured by Italy in 1942, and then by Germany in 1943, and sunk by US aircraft in 1944.

Place
Bombardopolis, Haiti, was known in English in the 18th & 19th centuries as Bombarde

Other
Bombard (music), a double reed instrument used to play traditional Breton music.
Bombarde (organ stop)